The 2017 Mitas Czech Republic FIM Speedway Grand Prix was the fourth race of the 2017 Speedway Grand Prix season. It took place on June 10 at the Markéta Stadium in Prague, Czech Republic.

Riders 
First reserve Peter Kildemand replaced Nicki Pedersen, who was injured and not fit to race. The Speedway Grand Prix Commission also nominated Václav Milík Jr. as the wild card, and Josef Franc and Matěj Kůs both as Track Reserves.

Results 
The Grand Prix was won by Australia's Jason Doyle, who beat world champion Greg Hancock and wild card Václav Milík Jr. in the final. It was the fifth Grand Prix win of Doyle's career, and the second time in a row that he won in Prague. Hancock had initially top scored during the qualifying heats.

Championship leader Patryk Dudek finished fourth in the final, maintaining a one-point leader over Doyle in the overall standings.

Heat details

Intermediate classification

References

See also 
 Motorcycle speedway

Czech Republic
Speedway Grand Prix
Sports competitions in Prague
2017 in Czech sport
Speedway Grand Prix of Czech Republic